Oss West is a railway station located in Oss, Netherlands.

History

The station was opened in 1981, 100 years after Oss railway station opened, and is located on the Tilburg–Nijmegen railway. The train services are operated by Nederlandse Spoorwegen.

On 20 September 2018 the Oss rail accident occurred at the adjacent level crossing, resulting in four deaths.

Train services
The following services currently call at Oss West:
2x per hour local services (stoptrein) Nijmegen - Oss - 's-Hertogenbosch

External links
NS website 
Dutch Public Transport journey planner 

Railway stations in Oss
Railway stations opened in 1981